Brendan Evans and Ryan Sweeting were the defending champions, but Sweeting did not compete this year. Evans teamed up with Jamie Baker and lost in quarterfinals to tournament winners Alessandro da Col and Andrea Stoppini.

Alessandro da Col and Andrea Stoppini won the title by defeating Olivier Charroin and Érik Chvojka 6–2, 2–6, [10–8] in the final.

Seeds

Draw

Draw

References
 Main Draw (ATP)
 Qualifying Draw (ATP)

Fifth Third Bank Tennis Championships - Men's Doubles
2008 MD